Attu is a settlement in the Qeqertalik municipality in western Greenland, located on a small island on the shores of Davis Strait. Its population was 203 in 2020. It is the southernmost settlement in the municipality.

Transport 
Air Greenland serves the village as part of government contract, with winter-only helicopter flights from Attu Heliport to Aasiaat Airport and Kangaatsiaq Heliport. Settlement flights in the Disko Bay are unique in that they are operated only during winter and spring.

During summer and autumn, when the waters of Disko Bay are navigable, communication between settlements is by sea only, serviced by Diskoline. The ferry links Attu with Kangaatsiaq, and further with Iginniarfik, Ikerasaarsuk, Niaqornaarsuk, and Aasiaat.

Population 
Attu has experienced a sharp decline in population over a long period of time. The settlement lost nearly 36 percent of its population relative to the 1990 levels, and more than a quarter relative to the 2000 levels, with the population still decreasing.

References

Davis Strait
Populated places in Greenland
Populated places of Arctic Greenland